Scum with Boundaries is the second studio album by American rock duo The I.L.Y's. The album was released on July 16, 2016, through YouTube and SoundCloud.

Track listing

Personnel
The I.L.Y's
 Zach Hill – vocals, drums, keyboards, guitar, production
 Andy Morin – guitar, bass, engineering

References

External links

The I.L.Y's albums
2016 albums
Self-released albums